Jeffrey Alan "Jeff" Miron  (born January 31, 1957) is an American economist. He served as the chairman of the Department of Economics at Boston University from 1992 to 1998, and currently teaches at Harvard University, serving as a Senior Lecturer and Director of Undergraduate Studies in Harvard's Economics Department. Miron holds the position of Director of Economic Policy Studies at the Cato Institute.

Biography
Miron is an outspoken libertarian. He was one of the 166 economists to sign a letter to congressional leaders in opposition to the bailout plan put forth by the U.S. federal government in response to the financial crisis of 2007–2008. He advocated that those companies that floundered during the crisis should be bankrupt instead of receiving government help. He has proposed three policy reforms to help the US economy recover from the financial crisis: cutting entitlements, freezing regulation, and replacing the existing tax code with a flat tax on consumption. Miron has also spoken out against the Patient Protection and Affordable Care Act, arguing that it is economically unfeasible and will increase the US deficit; instead, he suggests limiting government intervention is the best way to lower overall health care costs and make health care accessible to the most people. He has studied the effects of drug criminalization for 15 years, and argues that all drugs should be legalized. He supports open borders, arguing that the United States should impose "no immigration restrictions at all." He opposes foreign interventions because "they cost far more than initially acknowledged while failing to help either America or the target countries."

Writings

References

External links
 Miron at Harvard University Department of Economics 
 
  Miron on Real Law Radio – discussing the benefits of legalizing marijuana from an economic perspective (March 27, 2010).
 

1957 births
Living people
20th-century American economists
21st-century American economists
American libertarians
Boston University faculty
Cato Institute people
Economists from Michigan
Harvard University faculty
Libertarian economists
Massachusetts Institute of Technology alumni
Non-interventionism
People from Detroit
Swarthmore College alumni